Paprotnia  is a village in the administrative district of Gmina Sadkowice, within Rawa County, Łódź Voivodeship, in central Poland.

The village has a population of 370.

References

Paprotnia